Endograptis is a genus of moth in the family Cosmopterigidae. It contains only one species, Endograptis pyrrhoptila, which is found on Samoa.

References

External links
Natural History Museum Lepidoptera genus database

Cosmopteriginae